Nicole Johnson (born January 9, 1974) is an American beauty queen, author, public health professional and activist. Crowned Miss America 1999  and Miss Virginia 1998, she became the first Miss America with diabetes and the first contestant to publicize the use of an insulin pump.  She now advocates for diabetes research, treatment, and education, having been diagnosed with type 1 diabetes in 1993.

Education
Johnson holds a B.A. in English from the University of South Florida and an M.A. in journalism from the  School of Communication & the Arts at Regent University in Virginia. She also has a Master of Public Health degree from the University of Pittsburgh gained in 2007. In 2013, Johnson received a Doctor of Public Health degree from the University of South Florida.

Pageantry

Early pageantry
Johnson first started competing in pageants in Florida and placed in the Top 10 at Miss Florida in 1995 and was third runner-up in the Miss Florida USA 1995 pageant. After moving to Virginia to pursue post-graduate education at Regent University she continued competing and placed in the top ten at Miss Virginia 1997.

Miss Virginia 1998
In March 1998 she won the Miss Lynchburg Festival title and went on to win the Miss Virginia 1998 title on June 29, 1998.

Miss America 1999
In September Johnson represented Virginia in the Miss America 1999 pageant, becoming the second woman representing that state to win the Miss America title.  She sang "That's Life" in the talent competition. In 1997 she started wearing an insulin pump on her hip to control her illness, which she wore while competing at Miss Virginia and Miss America, the first Miss America contestant and winner to do so.

Diabetes activism

Johnson became a spokesperson for the American Diabetes Association in the 1990s and had testified in legislative hearings in Washington, D.C. prior to winning the Miss Virginia title.

In 2004, her communication skills and journalism background led her to become the anchor of dLife, a weekly TV series about diabetes that aired on CNBC. Johnson has also written several books over her career: three cookbooks with Mr. Food, an independent cookbook titled, Nicole Johnson's Diabetes Recipe Makeovers, an autobiography titled Living with Diabetes, and a book for young adults titled, Young Adult Type 1 Diabetes Realities.

She continues to work as a diabetes advocate and patient care expert - professionally and in a volunteer capacity. Her consulting clients have included Novo Nordisk, Animas Corporation, AmMed Direct LLC and Eli Lilly and Company. On a volunteer basis, she has served in leadership roles within the JDRF and the American Diabetes Association. Her academic credentials have most recently led her to public health work at the University of South Florida where she is the Executive Director of a program she created called Bringing Science Home. In 2010, Johnson founded Students With Diabetes (SWD), at the University of South Florida, to serve the needs of the young adult population with diabetes.

Personal life
Johnson was briefly engaged to investment banker Conn Jackson in 2000.

In 2003, Johnson married journalist Scott Baker. The couple met in the mid-90s at a seminar Baker held for college students interested in news careers. Together the couple had a daughter. Johnson and Baker later divorced in 2008.

=Filmography
|-
| 2008 || dLife || Herself (host) || Television

References

External links

Official website
Miss America official website

Miss America winners
Miss America 1999 delegates
Miss Virginia winners
1974 births
Living people
University of South Florida alumni
University of Pittsburgh School of Public Health alumni
Regent University alumni
People from Atlanta
People from Seminole, Florida
People with type 1 diabetes